Eric Michael Webber AKC (called Michael) was Dean of Hobart from 1959 to 1971.

He trained for the priesthood at King's College London; and was ordained in 1943. He began his career with a curacies in Clapham and Wimbledon. He was the  Rector of Eshowe from 1951 to 1956; and of Lapworth with Baddesley Clinton until his appointment as Dean of Hobart.

References

Alumni of the Theological Department of King's College London
Associates of King's College London
Deans of Hobart
Possibly living people
Year of birth missing